Whilst the sport of rugby league is played across Great Britain, it is most popular in its heartlands, the traditional counties of Yorkshire and Lancashire with the majority of professional and semi-professional clubs coming from this area of the country. Many fixtures are considered to be local derbies, where both teams come from the same town or city, or two that are very close to each other.

Derbies

Battle of the Borough Derby
The "Battle of the Borough” refers to the rivalry between two teams from the Metropolitan Borough of Wigan - Leigh Leopards and the historically more dominant Wigan Warriors.

This rivalry has been absent for most of the Super League era with the two teams only competing in the same division on four occasions - 2005, 2017, 2021 and 2023.

Calder Derby

The Calder Derby is contested between Castleford Tigers and Wakefield Trinity, with both Wakefield and Castleford being part of the City of Wakefield metropolitan borough, which the River Calder flows through.

Historically Wakefield have been the more successful side, winning two league titles and five Challenge Cups. However, Castleford have been the more successful side in recent years winning five out the six games played in the 2014 and 2015 season by large margins.  In terms of silverware, Castleford have also been the most successful in modern times winning three Challenge Cups since 1969 and appearing in five finals. Wakefield have only appeared in one final during this period.

Both clubs also have a local rivalry with Featherstone Rovers, however this rivalry is not as strong due to competitive games between these sides nowadays being rare as Featherstone have played most of their recent seasons in the Championship. Before the Super League era, Featherstone derbies between Castleford, Featherstone and Wakefield were more closely and bitterly contested.

Cheshire Derby
The Cheshire Derby is a local derby between Warrington and Widnes. Both towns lie in the traditional county of Lancashire, but have been administered as part of Cheshire since 1974.

Both teams struck up a rivalry in the mid and late 20th century being local rivals and being somewhat dominant forces in the Challenge Cup, Widnes being known as the Cup Kings in the late 1970s and 1980s.  Widnes were relegated in 2005, not returning to the Super League until 2011, whilst Warrington began to challenge the dominance of sides such as Leeds, Wigan and St Helens at the top.

Cumbria Derby
The main derby in Cumbria is between Whitehaven and Workington Town, just a few miles apart from each other and connected by the A595 in the traditional county of Cumberland.

Both Whitehaven and Workington have a rivalry with Barrow Raiders in southwest Cumbria, in the traditional Furness area of Lancashire.  The rivalry between Barrow and the other Cumbrian sides isn't as pronounced as travelling between Barrow and West Cumbria is difficult because of the terrain and the local roads.

East Lancashire Derby
The East Lancashire Derby takes place between Oldham Roughyeds and Rochdale Hornets, both teams are based in the North East of Greater Manchester, and previously South East Lancashire. The two teams contest The Law Cup as a pre-season friendly on an annual basis.

French Derby
Despite not having played each other since both club's time in the Elite One Championship, the tie between Catalans Dragons and Toulouse Olympique was labeled the French Derby following Toulouse's promotion to the Super League in 2021.

Good Friday Derby

The Good Friday Derby is contested between Wigan Warriors and St. Helens. Named as such as they traditionally meet on Good Friday (and also Boxing Day before Super League saw the sport switch to a summer schedule). The towns of St Helens and Wigan lie only eight miles apart in the traditional county of Lancashire. The two clubs have been the most successful clubs in England winning 31 Challenge Cups and 33 league titles between them. They have also met in three Grand Finals in the Super League era.

Heavy Woollen Derby

The Heavy Woollen Derby is a local derby contested between Batley Bulldogs and Dewsbury Rams.  Both the towns of Batley and Dewsbury are in the Heavy Woollen district of Yorkshire, an area named after the heavy woollen cloth that was manufactured there in the 1800s.

Hull Derby

The Hull Derby is contested by Hull F.C. from the west side and Hull Kingston Rovers from the east side of the city of Kingston upon Hull.  The two teams are separated by the River Hull.  In the late 1990s a merger was proposed between the two clubs to form a team known as Humberside or simply Hull but this was later rejected.  The rivalry was at its highest during the 1980s when both Hull sides were the dominant forces in the league.  The Hull Derby is considered to be one of the most fierce in Rugby League due to both of the clubs residing from within the same city.

Leeds Derby
The Leeds Derby is contested between Leeds and Hunslet.  Leeds play in the north Leeds district of Headingley whilst Hunslet is a district in southern  Leeds.  The rivalry between Leeds and Hunslet has become very one-sided due to Leeds becoming one of the so-called big four sides in recent times, whilst Hunslet have rarely played in the top division in decades.  Therefore, the two teams rarely meet in competitive fixtures.  There was also a third Leeds Derby until Bramley folded in 2000.

Locker Cup Derby

The Locker Cup Derby is contested between Lancashire teams Warrington Wolves and Wigan Warriors. The teams are two of the most successful in England and their rivalry has greatly intensified since 2010 due to the rise in success of Warrington Wolves. The rivalry has varied in intensity throughout history with both clubs having stronger rivalries with Widnes Vikings and St Helens respectively.

London Derby
The London Derby is contested between London Broncos and London Skolars; these teams being the only professional or semi-professional sides within Greater London.  As yet, there isn't much of a rivalry as neither team had met in the same division until recent times, and the Broncos have played at many different grounds around London, therefore making it difficult to build a stable fan base.  However they play each other in a pre-season friendly called the Capital Challenge which is held at the Artillery Grounds.

Roses Derbies

Games between Yorkshire clubs Halifax and Huddersfield Giants against traditional Lancashire clubs Oldham and Rochdale Hornets are often called Roses Derbies or Wars of the Roses due to the clubs being located near the edge of the county boundaries.  Meetings between Oldham and Huddersfield were particularly competitive up until the mid 1990s.

Salford Derby
An East Lancashire rivalry has previously existed with in the City of Salford exists between Salford City Reds and Swinton Lions, this fixture is also known as the Salford Derby, despite Swinton now being based in Sale.

South Yorkshire Derby
The South Yorkshire Derby is contested between Sheffield Eagles and Doncaster.  The only competitive matches between the two have occurred in the Championship.  Sheffield are the more successful team, winning back-to-back Championship titles in 2012 and 2013, and the Challenge Cup in 1998.

War of the Roses Derby

The term War of the Roses is used to describe the rivalry between Lancashire giant Wigan Warriors and Yorkshire giant Leeds Rhinos. The two sides generated a rivalry out of being two of the best sides in the country. The term started use after the War of the Roses county of origin series was discontinued.

Welsh Derby
The Big Welsh Derby is played between the only two Welsh clubs in the professional ranks of British rugby league.

Celtic Crusaders joined the national leagues in 2006 and were, at that time, the only Welsh side outside the amateur game. They left South Wales and moved to Wrexham in 2009. This led to Wales' second club South Wales Scorpions being formed. In 2011, Celtic Crusaders folded and the new club North Wales Crusaders were entered into League 1 in 2012.

West Yorkshire Derby

The rivalry between the Leeds Rhinos and the Bradford Bulls is one of the great rivalries in English Rugby League and is the most common fixture termed the West Yorkshire Derby. The cities are next to one another and the teams have met in countless cup finals. During the early years of the Super League the rivalry peaked, with both Leeds and Bradford being dominant forces in Rugby League, challenging for numerous titles whilst meeting in Grand Finals and Challenge Cups. Bradford fell into financial trouble in 2011 and 2012, had not won or appeared in a final since 2005 and had to sell players to keep the club alive. The rivalry remains passionate despite Bradford's decline and  Leeds continuing to win many more titles. Bradford were relegated in 2014, the first time in 40 years, ending competitive league fixtures between the sides. The most recent competitive meeting between the two sides was a Challenge Cup sixth round tie in May 2019, which Bradford won 24-22 to progress to the quarter finals.

Many other derbies take place in West Yorkshire with specific names such as the Calder derby and the Heavy Woollen derby. The Festive Challenge is an annual boxing day friendly between rivals Leeds Rhinos and Wakefield Trinity. The Castleford verses Leeds rivalry has become a more prominent derby in recent times.

Super League Big Four

In addition to traditional local derbies, a four-way rivalry exist between the so-called Super League Big Four, reflecting the success of recent teams in certain years. These four team are usually contain the champion of every season, both in the Super League (Grand Final and League Leaders) and Challenge Cup.

The Big Four consists of Wigan Warriors, St Helens, Leeds Rhinos, and Warrington Wolves. Prior to 2010, Bradford Bulls was considered a Big Four member, before the rise of Warrington, the club has since dropped in performance level and now plays in the Championship.

Results of the Big Four
Key
Number denotes league position

See also

List of sports rivalries in the United Kingdom
Rivalries in the National Rugby League

References
General
https://www.loverugbyleague.com/post/when-is-a-derby-not-a-derby/
https://www.seriousaboutrl.com/ranking-the-top-10-rivalries-in-british-rugby-league-37673/
In-line

External links

Sports rivalries in the United Kingdom
Rugby league rivalries
Rugby league in the United Kingdom